Lisa Madden (born 27 August 1992) is an Irish model and beauty pageant titleholder who was crowned Miss Universe Ireland 2014 and represented Ireland at Miss Universe 2014.

Modelling

The Model Agent 
In 2009, Madden was a contestant on The Model Agent, a televised modelling competition that aired on RTÉ2. She was eliminated in the second episode.

Britain & Ireland's Next Top Model 
In 2012, Madden participated in the eighth cycle of Britain & Ireland's Next Top Model, the British and Irish version of America's Next Top Model, where she placed fourth.

Pageantry

Miss Universe Ireland 2014
Madden was crowned as Miss Universe Ireland 2014, where she represented Cork.

Miss Universe 2014
Madden competed at Miss Universe 2014. She did not place.

References

1992 births
Living people
Miss Universe Ireland winners
Miss Universe 2014 contestants
Alumni of University College Cork
Britain & Ireland's Next Top Model contestants
Beauty pageant contestants from Ireland